Gilad Hochman (born 26 July 1982 in Herzliya) is an Israeli classical music composer.

Education

Hochman was born to an Odessa native father and a Paris native mother and currently resides in Berlin, Germany. He began his musical life at the age of 6, studying the piano, and started composing at the age of 9. At 18 he graduated from the Herzeli'ya Music Conservatory, where he studied under composer Ilya Heifets and pianist Mark Shaviner. In 2007 Hochman graduated with honors from the Buchman-Mehta School of Music at Tel Aviv University, studying composition under Gil Shohat, musicology and theoretical subjects under some of Israel's leading senior musicians.

Reception
Hochman's music was described as “written with a true artist’s hand”, “the highpoint of an exciting performance”, “sheds new light on customary expressions in music” and as “original, fascinating, unusual and colorful” by the Israeli Prime Minister Award committee in 2007.  He was also defined as “one of Israel’s most important composers” in an article concerning “composer Gilad Hochman’s meteoric career", as "a rising star in the classical music world" and as an "already well known classical composer" by the BBC. The New York Times commented: "perhaps most impressive was Mr. Hochman’s gift for assembling musical gestures that come across as psychologically revealing, whether it’s players’ finishing each other's sentences, the neurotic instability suggested by a microtonal wobble on a held note or the freezing self-doubt of a painfully quiet passage."

At the age of 24 Hochman became the youngest composer to be awarded the prestigious Israeli Prime Minister Award (2007) for his artistic work. At age 22 he was the youngest to be appointed composer in residence by one of Israel’s most known orchestras, Ra’anana Symphonette. He founded and artistically directed the Arco String Ensemble and the New Sounds concert series of the Israel Composers’ League and in 2007 won a merit certificate from the city of Ra'anana. In 2017 he was awarded the S&R Washington Award for his musical work.

Compositions

Hochman's oeuvre includes a range of compositions for solo instruments, chamber music, choirs and orchestras which reflects a variety of aesthetic approaches. His music is, on the one hand, a continuation of western classical music's development, yet on the other hand he puts a great emphasis on themes relating to Jewish tradition and his Israeli origin. His diverse body of works includes Whom My Soul Loveth for solo cello and mixed choir, commissioned by the Chorbiennale of Aachen, Germany in year 2009. The piece explores feeling of human yearning and is based upon a single verse from the biblical Solomon's Song of Songs (3:1). In this work Hochman originally defines the place of the individual cello vis-à-vis the choir surrounding it, creating a dialogue that shifts between a whispered prayer and dramatic, powerfully expressive climaxes. The uniqueness of this work does not derive solely from the unconventional ensemble, but more significantly from Hochman's sensitive treatment of the melodic phrases, the gradual construction of the dramatic progression and the way in which the distinctive artistic goal is reached in the end.

 

Hochman's music is commissioned and performed by leading musicians and music institutes worldwide. It was played, among others, by Oriol Ensemble, the Kammerorchester Berlin, Synergy Ensemble, Musica Nova Ensemble, XelmYa Ensemble – Berlin, Ensemble Meitar, Ensemble Sirenot, the Aachener Kammerchor, Studium Chorale, Tel Aviv Soloists Ensemble and the Israel Chamber Orchestra. It was also performed at the Heidelberg Biennale for New Music, Aachen International Chorbiennale, Israel Music Fest, the Israeli Schubertiade, Musica Sacra Festival - Maastricht and in dozens of different concert series and in music academies like Sibelius Academy (Helsinki), UdK (Berlin), Guildhall School of Music (London), Juilliard (New York) and Rubin (Jerusalem).

See also
Music of Israel

References

External links 
 Official Website

Israeli composers
Contemporary classical composers
21st-century classical composers
1982 births
Living people
Tel Aviv University alumni
Jewish classical composers
Israeli Jews
Male classical composers
21st-century male musicians